The House of Bülow is the name of an old German and Danish noble family of Mecklenburg origin, members of which have borne the title of Baron (Freiherr), Count (Graf) or Prince (Fürst).

History
The family traces its main line back to one knight Godofridus de Bulowe, mentioned in a 1229 deed. He was named after the village of Bülow near Königsfeld, then part of the Bishopric of Ratzeburg. The family made great donations to nearby Rehna Abbey.

As Bülow was also a word for oriole in the local dialect based on Wendish roots, the bird is depicted as a crest in the family's coat of arms.

In Mecklenburg the family acquired around 110 estates, castles or villages from 1229 onwards, nine of which remained in its possession until the confiscations in communist East Germany in 1945. From 1470 to this day the family holds the manor of Gudow in Saxe-Lauenburg (today part of the former West-German state of Schleswig-Holstein), and in the 19th century it acquired three more estates nearby, also still owned by family members.

In the 14th century, four members officiated as Bishops of Schwerin; one Dietrich von Bülow was Bishop of Lebus from 1490 onwards. Numerous female members joined the convent of Dobbertin Abbey. In 1383 the Mecklenburg knight Heinrich von Bülow burnt down the village and church of Wilsnack; thereafter, the rebuilt Church of the Holy Blood of Wilsnack became a destination of medieval religious pilgrimages.

The most notable family members are Hans von Bülow (1830–1894), pianist, conductor and composer who married Liszt's daughter Cosima, who later left him for Richard Wagner, and Prince Bernhard von Bülow (1849–1929), Chancellor of Germany from 1900 to 1909.

Notable members
Andreas von Bülow (born 1937), German politician, former government minister and author of a 9/11 conspiracy book
Babette von Bülow (1850–1927), German author of short stories, comedies and farces under the male pen name Hans Arnold
Bernhard Ernst von Bülow (1815–1879), Danish and German statesman, father of the Bernhard von Bülow (below)
Bernhard von Bülow, Prince (1849–1929), Chancellor of the German Empire from 1900 to 1909
Bertha von Marenholtz-Bülow (1810–1893), German educator
Christoph Carl von Bülow (1716–1788), Prussian general under Frederick the Great
Claus (von Bülow*) (1926–2019), Anglo-Danish lawyer and socialite. (Born Claus Borberg, he adopted his mother's family name.)
Cosima (von Bülow*) Pavoncelli (born 1967), American socialite and philanthropist, daughter of Claus (von Bülow*) and Sunny (von Bülow*)
Cosima Wagner daughter of Franz Liszt. Wife of Hans von Bülow, she left von Bülow for composer Richard Wagner.
Dietrich Heinrich von Bülow (1757–1807), a.k.a. Heinrich Dietrich Bülow, Prussian officer during the Napoleonic Wars, military theorist, and brother of Friedrich Wilhelm von Bülow
 (1791–1858), Danish general leading the defence of Fredericia during the 1849 Battle of Fredericia
Friedrich Gustav von Bülow (1814–1893), founder of 
Friedrich Wilhelm Freiherr von Bülow, (1755–1816), Prussian general during the Napoleonic Wars
Frits Toxwerdt von Bülow, (1872–1955), Danish politician and government minister.
Hans, Count von Bülow (1774–1825), Westphalian and Prussian statesman and senior president of Silesia 
Hans von Bülow (1830–1894), pianist, conductor and composer who married Liszt's daughter Cosima, who later left him for Richard Wagner
Hans von Bülow (1816–1897), Prussian general who fought during Austro-Prussian War, and Franco-Prussian War.
Harry von Bülow-Bothkamp (1897–1976), German fighter ace in two World wars, brother of Walter von Bülow-Bothkamp
Heinrich von Bülow (1792–1846), Prussian ambassador to England from 1827 to 1840, uncle of Bernhard
Heinrich von Bülow (Grotekop) (died before 1395/1415?), known as Big Head, who in 1383 destroyed Wilsnack
Johan Hartvig Victor Carl von Bülow, Rittmester (1754–1823), Norwegian-Swedish vice general during the Swedish-Danish war of Norway
Johann Albrecht von Bülow (1708–1776), Prussian general under Frederick the Great
Karl von Bülow (1846–1921), German general during World War I
Otto von Bülow (1911–2006), German World War II U-boat commander
Sunny von Bülow (1932–2008), wife of Claus von Bülow; husband was accused of poisoning her
Vicco von Bülow a.k.a. Loriot (1923–2011), German humorist, graphic artist
Walter von Bülow-Bothkamp (1894–1918), German fighter ace, brother of Harry von Bülow-Bothkamp

Heraldry
The blazon of the family's coat of arms is: Azure, fourteen bezants in pile, displayed four, four, three, two, one. The family's heraldic animal is the oriole, which can be seen in the armorial crest below.

References

External links

 Website of the Bülow family

 
Surnames